Citizen Brain is the second album by the Irish thrash metal band Gama Bomb. It was released on 9 June 2008 in Europe and 24 June 2008 in the United States and rest of the world by Earache Records. A Bonus DVD featuring tour and studio footage was included in early pressings of the album.

Track listing 
All tracks written by Gama Bomb, except "Bullet Belt" and "Space Invaders" (music by Kevy Canavan, lyrics by Gama Bomb), "Evil Voices" and "Thrashoholic" (music by Gama Bomb/Kevy Canavan, lyrics by Gama Bomb).

In-song references 
Citizen Brain contains many subtle pop-culture references, with musical allusions to cult favourites The A-Team ("Final Fight"), This Is Your Life ("Sentenced to Thrash"), Mario Brothers, Tetris ("Final Fight"), Teenage Mutant Ninja Turtles ("Return of the Technodrome"), RoboCop ("OCP") and Superman ("In the Court of General Zod"). There are also lyrical references to Commando, EC Comics, Ren and Stimpy, The Twilight Zone, Final Fight, Streets of Rage and to other thrash bands.

References

External links 
 Earache Records

2008 albums
Gama Bomb albums
Earache Records albums